Lev Leviev may refer to:

 Lev Avnerovich Leviev (born 1956), Israeli businessman and philanthropist
 Lev Binzumovich Leviev (born 1984), Russian–Israeli Internet entrepreneur and investor

See also
 Lev (given name)
 Leviev (surname)